Olafr Havrevold (26 May 1895 – 11 July 1972) was a Norwegian engineer and actor.

Biography
He was born at Christiania (now Oslo), Norway. He was the son of Lauritz Paulsen Havrevold (1859–1940) and Marta Malena Nielsen (1873–1927). He was a brother of writer Finn Havrevold (1905–1988) and psychiatrist Odd Havrevold (1900–1991).  After graduating artium 1914 and a year of study in liberal arts at the University of Washington in Seattle, he graduated as a chemistry engineer at  Norwegian Institute of Technology (NTH) in Trondheim during 1920.

He made his stage debut at the short-lived  Intimteatret  in Oslo during 1922. He  worked for the National Theater in Oslo from 1923 to 1965. He also played for Radioteatret and Fjernsynsteatret. He held the presidency in the Norwegian Stage Instructor's Association from 1954 to 1959 and participated in the board of the State Teaterskole from 1956.

In 1939  he received the   Norwegian Theatre Critics Award (Teaterkritikerprisen) jointly with Lars Tvinde.
In 1951 he won the King's Medal of Merit (Kongens fortjenstmedalje) in gold. He was decorated Knight of the Swedish Order of Vasa.

Personal life
He was married twice, to Unni Torkildsen (1901–1968) and Gøril Egede-Nissen (1914–1992). He died in 1972 and was buried at Vestre gravlund in Oslo.

References

1895 births
1972 deaths
Male actors from Oslo
University of Washington College of Arts and Sciences alumni
Norwegian male stage actors
Norwegian male silent film actors
20th-century Norwegian male actors
20th-century Norwegian engineers
Knights of the Order of Vasa
Recipients of the King's Medal of Merit in gold
Burials at Vestre gravlund